Stone Cold Sober is the fifth studio album by German thrash metal band Tankard. It was released on 9 June 1992 and reissued in 2005 by Nuclear Blast.

Track listing

Personnel 
 Andreas "Gerre" Geremia – vocals
 Frank Thorwarth – bass
 Andy Boulgaropoulos – guitars
 Axel Katzmann – guitars
 Arnulf Tunn – drums

References 

1992 albums
Tankard (band) albums
Noise Records albums
Albums produced by Harris Johns